Rema tetraspila is a moth of the family Erebidae. The genus was erected by Francis Walker in 1865.

References 

Moths of Asia
Moths described in 1865